Rakovice is a village and municipality in Piešťany District in the Trnava Region of western Slovakia.

History
In historical records the village was first mentioned in 1262.

Geography
The municipality lies at an altitude of 160 metres and covers an area of 6.957 km². It has a population of about 510 people.

References

External links
http://www.statistics.sk/mosmis/eng/run.html

Villages and municipalities in Piešťany District